Hankyu  is a train station along the Hankyu Railway Kyoto Line.

Location

Saiin station's singular entrance is situated on the southwest corner of Shijo street and Nishioji street in Kyoto, Kyoto Prefecture, Japan. Saiin Station is located in Saiin Kōzanji-chō, Ukyō-ku, Kyoto.

Service 

Usage
In fiscal 2015, the Hankyu station was used by 16,087,000 passengers annually (both exiting and entering passengers). Over the same year, the Randen station was used by 1,674,000 passengers annually (both exiting and entering passengers). For historical data, see the table below.

Attractions

Dining

A variety of quaint restaurants, izakaya, and fast food locations lie within short walking distance of the station.

Retail

A few large retail outlets and a variety of small shops line the streets surrounding Saiin Station. A 100 yen shuttle bus stops in front of Saiin Station and carries passengers directly to the retail area.

A 100-yen store is located directly above Saiin station's entrance.

There are many convenience stores within a 2 or 3 minute walk of Saiin Station.

Hotels

The Rhino hotel is located directly beside Saiin Station.

Historical sites 

Kōzan-ji, a small Buddhist temple, is located directly across from Saiin Station, on the northeast corner of Nishioji street and Shijo Street, less than one-minute walking distance.

Gaming 
Several pachinko parlors are located within walking distance of Saiin Station.

History 

At the time of opening, the station was the terminus of the Shinkeihan Railway, a former operator of the Hankyu Kyoto Line. On 31 March 1931, when the underground extension from Saiin to Keihan Kyoto Station (present-day Ōmiya Station) was completed, the station was moved from the ground level to the underground facilities and renamed Saiin Station.

Station numbering was introduced to all Hankyu stations on 21 December 2013 with this station being designated as station number HK-83.

At the time of the construction, a plan was tabled to link Saiin Station with the smaller and older Sai Station (located one-minute walking distance east on Shijo street) by means of an underground path, but the plan was eventually scrapped, due to strong opposition from people living in the area. The underground path was under construction until 2017.

Adjacent stations

References

External links

 Saiin Station from Hankyu Railway website

Railway stations in Kyoto
Hankyu Kyoto Main Line
Railway stations in Japan opened in 1928
Railway stations in Japan opened in 1910